The 2007–08 Ukrainian Premier League Reserves and Under 19 season are competitions between the reserves of Ukrainian Premier League Clubs and the Under 19s.

The events in the senior leagues during the 2004–05 season saw Illichivets Mariupol Reserves and Stal Alchevsk Reserves be relegated with Naftovyk Okhtyrka Reserves and Zakarpattia Uzhhorod Reserves entering the competition.

Current standings

Top scorers

See also
2007–08 Ukrainian Premier League

References

External links
 

Reserves
Ukrainian Premier Reserve League seasons